Feelin's may refer to: 
Feelin's (Sonny Stitt album) (Roost, 1962)
Feelin's (Teddy Edwards album) (Muse, 1975)

See also
 "Feelins'", a 1975 song by Conway Twitty and Loretta Lynn
 Feelins' (album),  a 1975 album by Conway Twitty and Loretta Lynn
 Feelings (disambiguation)